Lo Bello y lo Prohibido (Eng.: Beautiful and Forbidden) is the title of a studio album recorded by Spanish singer-songwriter Braulio, It was released by CBS Discos in late 1986. This album became his second number-one set on the Billboard Latin Pop Albums. The album yielded the singles "Juguete de Nadie", "En Bancarrota", "Noche de Boda" and "La Pu... ra Vida". "En Bancarrota" peaked at number-one in the Billboard Hot Latin Tracks chart for six weeks and at the 30th Annual Grammy Awards in 1988 was nominated for Best Latin Pop Performance, losing to Un hombre solo by Julio Iglesias.

Track listing

Personnel
This information adopted from Allmusic.
Ricardo Eddy Martínez – arranger, director, producer
Braulio García – producer
Eric Schilling – engineer, mixing
Mike Cuzzi – engineer
Ted Stein – engineer
Mike Todd – assistant engineer
Jerry Hinkle – photography

Chart performance

References

1986 albums
Braulio García albums
Spanish-language albums
CBS Discos albums